The Swan 76 was designed by Olin Stephens and built by Nautor's Swan and first launched in 1979. The boat was available in two versions, with flush deck or deckhouse. One deckhouse boat was built with a centreboard, the other with a fixed keel Five boats were built during a production run that ran from 1979-1981.

External links
 Nautor Swan
 S&S Swan Association
 S&S Blog

References

Sailing yachts
Keelboats
1970s sailboat type designs
Sailboat types built by Nautor Swan
Sailboat type designs by Olin Stephens
Sailboat type designs by Sparkman and Stephens